Be As You Are may refer to:

"Be as You Are (Songs from an Old Blue Chair)", album by Kenny Chesney
"Be as You Are" (Mike Posner song), song by Mike Posner from his 2016 album At Night, Alone

See also
As You Are (disambiguation)